The ruddy-capped nightingale-thrush (Catharus frantzii) is a small thrush which is a resident breeder in mountain forests from central Mexico to western Panama. A predominantly brown-plumaged bird, it has a rich song.

Taxonomy and naming
The species was first described by German ornithologist Jean Cabanis in 1861. The binomial commemorates the German naturalist Alexander von Frantzius. Its closest living relatives seem to be the North American species complex containing the veery, the gray-cheeked, and Bicknell's thrush.

Description

This species is 15–18 cm in length and weighs 28 g. The adult has olive-brown upperparts, a rufous crown and nape, pale grey underparts, becoming whitish on the belly, and an orange lower mandible. The juvenile is darker faced, has pale centres to the upperpart feathers, brownish flanks and breast, and dark barring or spots on the belly. Several poorly defined subspecies have been defined differing in the exact tone of the upper and underpart plumage.

This bird's song is a beautiful rich and varied whistle, shee-vee-li-ee-ree, and call is a high thin seet or whooeet.

Distribution and habitat
The ruddy-capped nightingale-thrush is a resident breeder in highlands from central Mexico to western Panama. It is found in the undergrowth of wet mountain oak and conifer forests and second growth, typically from about 1350 m to 3500 m altitude.

Behaviour
The ruddy-capped nightingale-thrush will normally forage on the forest floor, alone on in pairs, progressing in hops and dashes with frequent stops. It turns leaf litter in typical thrush fashion seeking insects and spiders, and also eats small fruits.

The nest is a bulky lined cup constructed 1–4 m high in dense undergrowth or a thicket, often near water. The two brown-blotched greyish or greenish-blue eggs are incubated by the female alone for 15–16 days to hatching, and the young are fed by both parents for 14–16 days more to fledgling.

References

Clement, Peter & Hathaway, Ren (2000): Thrushes. Christopher Helm, London. 
Stiles, F. Gary & Skutch, Alexander Frank (1989): A guide to the birds of Costa Rica. Comistock, Ithaca. 
Winker, Kevin & Pruett, Christin L. (2006): Seasonal migration, speciation, and morphological convergence in the avian genus Catharus (Turdidae). Auk 123(4): 1052–1068. [Article in English with Spanish abstract] DOI: 10.1642/0004-8038(2006)123[1052:SMSAMC]2.0.CO;2 PDF fulltext

ruddy-capped nightingale-thrush
Birds of Central America
Birds of Guatemala
ruddy-capped nightingale-thrush